Daniel Thomas is an American former Negro league outfielder who played between 1939 and 1940.

Thomas played for the Cleveland Bears in 1939 and for the Birmingham Black Barons in 1940. In 19 recorded career games, he posted 11 hits and two RBI in 61 plate appearances.

References

External links
 and Seamheads

Year of birth missing
Place of birth missing
Birmingham Black Barons players
Cleveland Bears players